Elwood Haynes "Bud" Hillis (March 6, 1926 – January 4, 2023) was an American politician and lawyer from Indiana. He was a Republican member of the United States House of Representatives, serving Indiana's 5th congressional district for 8 terms from 1971 to 1987.

Personal life and early career 
Born in Kokomo, Indiana, Hillis attended Kokomo public schools.
He graduated from Culver Military Academy, 1944.
B.S., Indiana University, 1949.
J.D., Indiana University School of Law, 1952.

Bud Hillis was a younger brother to renowned choral director Margaret Hillis. Their father, Glen R. Hillis, was the Republican nominee for Governor of Indiana in 1940, losing by less than 4,000 votes. His maternal grandfather and namesake, Elwood Haynes, was an inventor and automobile pioneer.

Hillis was a resident of Windsor, Colorado. He died on January 4, 2023, at the age of 96.

Military career 
Hillis served in the United States Army in the European Theater with the rank of first lieutenant from 1944 to 1946. He retired from the Reserves in 1954 with rank of captain in the infantry.

Political career 
Hillis was admitted to the Indiana bar in 1952 and commenced practice in Kokomo.

Hillis served as a member of the Indiana House of Representatives, Ninety-fifth and Ninety-sixth General Assemblies.

Hillis also served as a delegate, Indiana State Republican conventions from 1962 to 1970.

Congress 
Hillis was elected as a Republican to the Ninety-second and to the seven succeeding Congresses (January 3, 1971 – January 3, 1987).
He was not a candidate for reelection in 1986.

Later career 
Hillis resumed the practice of law.

On March 17, 2010, Bud Hillis was honored for his years in public service at the Howard County Lincoln Day Dinner, held at the Kokomo Country Club in Kokomo, Indiana.

See also

References

 Retrieved on 2008-03-19
 

1926 births
2023 deaths
Republican Party members of the Indiana House of Representatives
Military personnel from Indiana
Indiana University alumni
United States Army officers
People from Kokomo, Indiana
Culver Academies alumni
United States Army personnel of World War II
United States Army reservists
Republican Party members of the United States House of Representatives from Indiana